Acantherus is a genus of slant-faced grasshoppers in the family Acrididae. There is one described species in Acantherus, A. piperatus from North America.

References

Further reading

 
 
 

Acrididae
Articles created by Qbugbot
Monotypic Orthoptera genera